The year 1603 in science and technology involved some significant events.

Astronomy
 Johann Bayer publishes the star atlas Uranometria, the first to cover the entire celestial sphere, and introducing a new system of star designation which becomes known as the Bayer designation.
 Dutch explorer Frederick de Houtman publishes his observations of the southern hemisphere constellations.

Exploration
 Acadia, the French colony in North America, is founded.

Mathematics
 Pietro Cataldi finds the sixth and seventh perfect numbers.

Medicine
 Girolamo Fabrici studies leg veins and notices that they have valves which only allow blood to flow toward the heart.

Institutions
 August 17 – Accademia dei Lincei, the oldest scientific academy in the world, is founded in Rome by Federico Cesi.

Births
 September 15 – John Jonston, Polish naturalist and physician (died 1675)
 Blaise Francois Pagan, French military engineer (died 1665)
 Abel Tasman, Dutch explorer (died 1659)

Deaths
 February 23 – François Viète, French mathematician (born 1540)
 Robert Alaine, English astronomer (born 1558)

References

 
17th century in science
1600s in science